11th SFFCC Awards
December 17, 2012

Best Picture: 
 The Master 

The 11th San Francisco Film Critics Circle Awards, honoring the best in film for 2012, were given on 17 December 2012.

Winners

Best Picture:
The Master
Best Director:
Kathryn Bigelow – Zero Dark Thirty
Best Original Screenplay:
Zero Dark Thirty – Mark Boal
Best Adapted Screenplay:
Lincoln – Tony Kushner
Best Actor:
Joaquin Phoenix – The Master
Best Actress:
Emmanuelle Riva – Amour
Best Supporting Actor:
Tommy Lee Jones – Lincoln
Best Supporting Actress:
Helen Hunt – The Sessions
Best Animated Feature:
ParaNorman
Best Foreign Language Film:
Amour • Austria / France / Germany
Best Documentary:
The Waiting Room
Best Cinematography:
Life of Pi – Claudio Miranda
Best Film Editing:
Argo – William Goldenberg
Best Production Design:
Moonrise Kingdom – Adam Stockhausen
Marlon Riggs Award (for courage & vision in the Bay Area film community):
Peter Nicks – The Waiting Room
Special Citation (for under-appreciated independent cinema):
Girl Walk//All Day

References

External links
 2012 San Francisco Film Critics Circle Awards

San Francisco Film Critics Circle Awards
2012 film awards
2012 in San Francisco